Verticillium nonalfalfae is a soilborne fungus in the order Hypocreales. It causes verticillium wilt in some plant species, particularly Ailanthus altissima. The fungus produces a resting mycelium characterized by brown-pigmented hyphae. It is most closely related to V. dahliae and V. alfalfae.

Description 

It is not possible to differentiate V. nonalfalfae and V. alfalfae from V. albo-atrum consistently using only morphological features. Verticillium albo-atrum may be found in co-infections with V. nonalfalfae on some hosts. The hyphae penetrate the root epidermal cells of hosts and enter the xylem.

Host and symptoms 
Verticillium nonalfalfae has a wide host range including hops, kiwifruit, spinach, solanaceous plants like eggplants and potatoes, and tree of heaven (A. altissima). Systemic infections appear on most hosts showing vascular wilts caused by xylem blockage. Additional symptoms including vascular discoloration and defoliation show almost exclusively on A. altissima. V. nonalfalfae tends not to infect non-target plants. In contrast with V. alfafae, it does not infect alfalfa.

Impact on hops 
One important host of V. nonalfalfae is hops, with infections found both in the United States and most places around the world. The symptoms of hosts infected by V. nonalfalfae on hops are categorized into two pathotypes: mild and lethal. Mild pathotypes primarily cause symptoms of curling and leaf tissue death.  Hops infected by V. nonalfalfae with the mild pathotype generally can survive the infection. For the lethal pathotype of V. nonalfalfae on hops, hosts suffer from rapid weakening that ultimately leads to death. The lethal form was discovered in hops in the 1940s in the United Kingdom and elsewhere in Europe later. Two pathotypes share similar peroxidase, which are thought to be contribute to their pathogenicity.

Disease cycle 
The disease cycle of Verticillium nonalfalfae is similar to that of other members of the genus. V. nonalfalfae overwinters by forming a resting mycelium in the soil.  However, unlike V. dahliae, for example, it does not produce microsclerotia.

Verticillium nonalfalfae infects in the spring via conidia in the soil; conidia are borne on conidiophores. It has been found that intraspecific grafting enhances V. nonalfalfae’s dispersal of conidia, that is, conidia from diseased roots can be transported to healthy root tissues. Conidia can be transmitted through mechanical dispersal, whereby the conidia become attached to cutting tools. In the case of hops, the fungus can spread during soil cultivation, via plantings from infested yards, and through soil moved by equipment and workers. Long-distance transportation of conidia involves insects such as ambrosia beetles, which are thought to be critical in creating regional outbreaks of wilting in Ailanthus.

Biological control of tree of heaven 
Another important host of V. nonalfalfae is Ailanthus altissima, also known as tree of heaven. This species of Ailanthus was introduced in the northeastern United States from the 1790s, and is now a forest management problem in 40 of the 48 contiguous states.  Spreading widely and quickly, it is considered to be an Invasive species.  V. nonalfalfae is being studied as a biological control of A. altissima. Symptoms of verticillium wilt on tree of heaven appear quickly after inoculation, according to studies.  A vector of the wilt is the weevil Eucryptorrhynchus brandti.

References

Further reading
Stajner, Natasa. "Identification and Differentiation of Verticillium Species with PCR Markers and Sequencing of ITS Region." Plant and Animal Genome XXIII Conference. Plant and Animal Genome.
Inderbitzin, Patrik, and Krishna V. Subbarao. "Taxonomic challenges-molecular evidence for species and sub-specific groups in Verticillium." 11 th International Verticillium Symposium. 2013.
Inderbitzin, Patrik, and Krishna V. Subbarao. "Verticillium systematics and evolution: How confusion impedes Verticillium wilt management and how to resolve it." Phytopathology 104.6 (2014): 564-574.

External links

MycoBank

Fungal plant pathogens and diseases
Fungi described in 2011
Hypocreales incertae sedis